Yasamal is a settlement and raion in Baku, Azerbaijan. It has a population of 245,900.

One of the central districts of Baku, Yasamal district, was established in 1932 as the administrative unit of the district, from the south to Sabail (3 km), west from Garadagh (3.2 km), north from Binagadi (2.8 km) and Nasimi (5 km) borders with regions. The territory of the district is 16.22 km2. Through the district, from the "Kurt Gate" and Badamdar settlement to the south bypassing Baku-Gazakh and Baku-Astara and west of New Yasamal to Baku via Baku-Gazakh, Baku-Astara and Baku-Yalama, and from Bilajari, there are exits to Gazakh and Baku-Yalama highways. 11 internally displaced persons live in the region. Of these, 5,497 families – 20,550 IDPs have been registered in the District Executive Authority up to now: The registered population density is 15,160 people per 1 sq. km. The population of the region is 118,776 people, with 48.5% males and 51.5% females. There are 8 higher education institutions, 5 secondary specialized educational institutions, 4 music schools, 30 kindergartens and 28 secondary schools (high school, gymnasium) where the number of teachers employed is 3,076 and the number of pupils is 29,643.

The Nizami, Academy of Sciences, Inshaatchilar, and 20 January subway stations are located in the district.

Municipality 
The elected local self-governing body of the district is Yasamal municipality. Pursuant to Article 210.1 of the Election Code of the Republic of Azerbaijan, members of local self-government municipalities are elected in multi-member constituencies on the basis of a relative majority system.

Economy 
Yasamal is located in one of the most important central districts of Baku. There are 9,153 different categories of economic objects in the district, and 100,382 workers and servants work in these economic objects. The average monthly salary in these enterprises was 622.7 AZN.

The macroeconomic indicators of Yasamal district in 2017 were as follows:

 The total volume of industrial output is 353.421 million AZN.
 Investments in fixed assets amounted to 299.604 million AZN.
 Construction and installation works out of the total investment in fixed assets amounted to 240.059 million AZN.
 The volume of contract work performed on its own was 603.872 million AZN.
 The volume of services in the transport sector amounted to 2432.532 million AZN.
 The volume of information and communication services is 659.695 million AZN.
 Retail trade turnover 2665.674 million AZN.
 Paid services provided to the population 1235.517 million AZN.
 The average monthly salary per employee is 655.1 AZN.

As of January 1, 2018, the total number capacity of Yasamal Telephone Junction is 179,832, the number of numbers used by the population is 152,888.

References

1932 establishments in Azerbaijan
Districts of Baku